Egon Brunswik Edler von Korompa (18 March 1903, Budapest7 July 1955, Berkeley, California) was a psychologist who made contributions to functionalism and the history of psychology.

Life

Early life and education
Brunswik was born in Budapest, Hungary, then part of the Austro-Hungarian Empire. He graduated from the Theresianische Akademie in 1921, after studying mathematics, science, classics, and history. He enrolled as a student of psychology at the University of Vienna, where he became an assistant in Karl Bühler's Psychological Institute (student colleagues included Paul F. Lazarsfeld and Konrad Lorenz) and received a PhD in 1927. While a graduate student in psychology, he also passed the state examination for Gymnasium teachers in mathematics and physics.

Early career
Brunswik established the first psychological laboratory in Turkey while he was visiting lecturer in Ankara during 1931–1932. He became Privatdozent at the University of Vienna in 1934. In 1933, however, Edward C. Tolman, chairman of the department of psychology at the University of California, spent a year in Vienna. He and Brunswik found that although they had been working in different areas of psychological research, their theories of behavior were complementary.

Berkeley
Brunswik met Edward C. Tolman in Vienna during 1933, and in 1935–1936 received a Rockefeller fellowship that enabled him to visit the University of California. He remained at Berkeley where he became an assistant professor of psychology in 1937 and a full professor in 1947.

Later life
On June 6, 1938, in New York City Brunswik married Else Frenkel-Brunswik (also a former assistant in Buhler's institute), who became well known as a psychoanalytically oriented psychologist and investigator of the authoritarian personality. Also in 1938 he participated in the International Committee composed to organise the International Congresses for the Unity of Science. Brunswik became an American citizen in 1943. After a long and painful bout of severe hypertension, Egon committed suicide in 1955.

Professional contributions

Probabilistic Functionalism
Brunswik's work in Vienna had culminated in the publication of Wahrnehmung und Gegenstandswelt in 1934. All of his subsequent work was devoted to the extension and elaboration of the fundamental position set forth in this book, namely, that psychology should give as much attention to the properties of the organism's environment as it does to the organism itself. He asserted that the environment with which the organism comes into contact is an uncertain, probabilistic one, however lawful it may be in terms of physical principles. Adaptation to a probabilistic world requires that the organism learn to employ probabilistic means to achieve goals and learn to utilize probabilistic, uncertain evidence (proximal cues) about the world (the distal object). His "probabilistic functionalism" was the first behavioral system founded on probabilism, an approach that is attracting increasing attention in the fields of learning, thinking, decision processes, perception, communication  and the study of curiosity. Brunswik's emphasis on the importance of the environment is reflected in the increasing development of "psychological ecology." He also created the term ecological validity.

History of psychology
Brunswik wrote a great deal about the history of psychology. His historical analysis is remarkable for its development in structural terms rather than in the customary longitudinal recapitulation of names, dates, and places. It consists of a general identification of the kinds of variables that have traditionally been employed in psychological theory and research and a description of the changes in the emphasis of these variables over time. Brunswik's theory stems as much from his analysis of the history of psychology as it does from his research. His historical as well as his theoretical analysis also led him to criticize orthodox methods of experimental design (particularly the "rule of one variable") and to suggest methods for avoiding what he believed to be an unfortunate artificiality inherent in classical experimental procedures.

Other work
Brunswik's main field of empirical research was perception, but he also brought his probabilistic approach to bear on problems of interpersonal perception, thinking, learning, and clinical psychology. His research findings were published in Perception and the Representative Design of Experiments (1947), which also includes Brunswik's methodological innovations and related research by others.

A feature of Brunswik's work is its coherence. Each theoretical, historical, and research paper is explicitly and tightly integrated with every other one. Brunswik's cast of mind compelled him to fit together with precision his conceptual framework, his methodology, and his views of the history of psychology. In 1952, he presented an overview of the field of psychology in The Conceptual Framework of Psychology.

Reception
Brunswik's ideas received wide attention during his lifetime and continue to do so. The extent of his direct influence on psychology, however, remains doubtful.

The application of his ideas in decision analysis helped improve the decisions of experts in a variety of fields including cancer prognosis, oil trading, and evaluation of candidates for graduate schools or employment. A specific, practical method for the application for Brunswik's models have been documented in the book How to Measure Anything: Finding the Value of Intangibles in Business by Douglas Hubbard.

See also
 Attention
 Decision making
 Functional psychology

Bibliography

References

Further reading
 Postman, Leo/Edward C. Tolman (1959): "Brunswik's Probabilistic Functionalism". In: S. Koch (Ed.), Psychology: A Study of a Science, Study 1: Conceptual and Systematic, Vol. 1: Sensory, Perceptual, and Physiological Formulations, New York/Toronto/London: McGraw-Hill, pp. 502–564.
 Hammond, Kenneth R. (editor) 1966 The Psychology of Egon Brunswik. New York: Holt.
 Hammond, Kenneth R. & T. R. Stewart (ed.) 2001. The Essential Brunswik. Cary, NC: Oxford University Press.
 Hammond, Kenneth. R. (editor) 2007 ''Beyond rationality: The search for wisdom in a troubled time''. Oxford University Press.

External links 
 The Brunswik Society
 Complete bibliography of the publications of Egon Brunswik (The Brunswik Society)
 "Original Brunswik", 2008 international conference

1903 births
1955 deaths
20th-century Hungarian people
20th-century Austrian people
Hungarian psychologists
Austrian psychologists
University of Vienna alumni
Austrian emigrants to the United States
University of California, Berkeley College of Letters and Science faculty
20th-century American psychologists
Physicians from Budapest
Austrian expatriates in Turkey
1955 suicides